Hail H.I.M. is the seventh studio album by Burning Spear, released in 1980

Track listing
"Hail H.I.M." (Winston Rodney)
"Columbus" (Rodney)
"Road Foggy" (Rodney)
"Follow Marcus Garvey" (Rodney)
"Jah See and Know" (Rodney)
"African Teacher" (Rodney)
"African Postman" (Rodney)
"Cry Blood Africans" (Rodney)
"Jah A Guh Raid" (Rodney)

Credits
Recorded and mixed at Tuff Gong Recording Studio, Kingston Jamaica
Engineers: Dennis Thompson and Errol Brown
Original album cover design and photography by Neville Garrick

Musicians
Winston Rodney - vocals, percussion, congos
Aston "Family Man" Barrett - bass, percussion
Nelson Miller - drums
Junior Marvin - guitar
Tyrone Downie - keyboards
Earl Lindo - keyboards
Bobby Ellis - trumpet
Herman Marquis - saxophone
Egbert Evans - horns

Burning Spear albums
1980 albums
EMI Records albums